"Drinkin' Beer. Talkin' God. Amen." is a song recorded by American country music singer Chase Rice featuring American country music duo Florida Georgia Line. It was released on November 30, 2020 as the second single from his album The Album. Rice wrote the song with Cale Dodds, Corey Crowder and Hunter Phelps, and produced with Crowder and Florida Georgia Line.

Background and content
It is the first collaboration between Rice and Florida Georgia Line since they co-wrote the latter's 2012 country music hit "Cruise".

Rice told to Radio.com he wrote the song with Cale Dodds, Hunter Phelps and Corey Crowder, and mentioned: “We wrote this song before the COVID-19 pandemic, which is crazy because it's almost like God was intervening in the song, said that, ‘Hey y’all, get ready. You're gonna have a lot of time to sit around a fire, drink some beer and hang out with me,’” “It's a special song in that way because it really is a celebration of what 2020 became for us and a lot of other people – slowing down to enjoy these moments with our loved ones and having deeper, more meaningful conversations with each other.”

Music video
The music video was released on March 28, 2021, directed by TK McKamy. It was filmed at an old granary on Rice's Nashville property, and seized three people open beer and talk about their life next to bonfire.

Rice told to CMT, pointed out the video's characteristic: “We weren't acting or remembering lines — we were just hanging out on my farm as real friends enjoying the night together. That's what this song is all about, and it was special to bring it to life.”

Commercial performance
The song peaked at No. 24 on the Billboard Hot 100 chart, becoming Rice's highest-charting career single to date.

Charts

Weekly charts

Year-end charts

Certifications

References

2020 singles
2020 songs
Chase Rice songs
Florida Georgia Line songs
Songs written by Corey Crowder (songwriter)
Songs written by Chase Rice
BBR Music Group singles
Vocal collaborations